Fox International Productions was the division of 20th Century Fox in charge of local production in China, Europe, India and Latin America.

History 

2008-2010

In 2008, 20th Century Fox started its international division, Fox International Productions, under president Sanford Panitch. The division was to not only handle international distribution of Fox films and third-party films, but also produce films in international countries, such as Latin America, India, China and Europe. The division's productions would be released on home video by 20th Century Fox Home Entertainment (now 20th Century Studios Home Entertainment) and streaming on Hulu as of 2012. From 2008 until its closure, the division has released 80 films either in the US or internationally.

The division's first release was the international version of Tom Cruise's Valkyrie (December 2008). By 2010, the company had two critically acclaimed and Academy Award-nominated films with When We Leave and The Yellow Sea.

From 2009 to the division's closure, Fox International handled Colombian and Swedish distribution of films produced by Sony Pictures Animation.

From 2010 to 2016, Fox International released Russian films.

2010-2017

Fox International then handled co-distribution of the Brazilian animated film Worms (June 2013). The company had $900 million in box-office receipts by the time Panitch left the company for Sony Pictures on June 2, 2015. Co-president of worldwide theatrical marketing and distribution for 20th Century Fox Tomas Jegeus was named president of Fox International Productions effective September 1, 2015. The company struck a development and production deal in November 2015 with Zhejiang Huace, a Chinese entertainment group.

Fox International also internationally distributed four of DreamWorks's releases; Kung Fu Panda 3 (with Chinese distribution handled by Oriental DreamWorks, January 2016), Trolls (November 2016), The Boss Baby (March 2017), and Captain Underpants: The First Epic Movie (June 2017), and handled the UK distribution of Pathe's The Pyramind (November 2014) and Selma (February 2015).

Closure and aftermath

In December 2017, 20th Century Fox film chairman-CEO Stacey Snider indicated that Fox International Productions would be dissolved in favor of each local and regional offices producing or acquiring projects, resulting in many upcoming projects that Fox International was set to distribute outside of the US to be sold to either its parent company 20th Century Fox or Searchlight Pictures, or even Buena Vista International (Fox International's successor).

The division's library is currently owned by 20th Century Fox (now 20th Century Studios), while Buena Vista International is Fox International's successor and its parent company's new international distributor, while the company's North American distribution unit was folded into Walt Disney Studios Motion Pictures. The studio's last initial release was the international release of The Greatest Showman (December 2017), and its last official release was Misbehavior (March 2020).

Management and distribution 

From 2008 to 2015, Sanford Panitch ran the company as president, and from 2015 to the division's closure, it was run by Tomas Jegeus. Like other Fox units, Stacey Snider ran Fox International.

Meanwhile, the employees are from China, Latin America and Australia.

From 2008 to the division's closure, Fox International self-distributed or co-distributed their films theatrically and on home video. The company released two films from Pathe Distribution, nine films from Russian companies, and three films from DreamWorks internationally.

Filmography
All Fox International Productions films have been distributed by 20th Century Fox in their native countries, unless marked.

Main releases

Other releases

Cloudy with a Chance of Meatballs (2009) (Colombian and Swedish distribution only; produced by Sony Pictures Animation)

Nine (2009) (Danish distribution only)

The King's Speech (2010) (Australian and Swedish distribution only)

Jack and Jill (2011) (Danish distribution only)

Scream 4 (2011) (Irish and Mexican distribution only; produced by Dimension Films)

Starbuck (2011) (Korean and Spanish distribution only; produced by Entertainment One and Hopscotch)

The SpongeBob Movie: Sponge Out of Water (2015) (Colombian distribution only; produced by Paramount Animation and Nickelodeon Movies)

Hotel Transylvania 2 (2015) (Colombian, Swedish and Korean theatrical distribution only; produced by Sony Pictures Animation)

Fantastic 4 (2015) (Korean distribution only; produced by 20th Century Fox and Constantin Film)

Norm of the North (2016) (Latin American and Korean distribution only; produced by Lionsgate and Splash Entertainment)

The BFG (2016) (South Asian and German distribution only; produced by Amblin Entertainment and Reliance Entertainment)

Independence Day: Resurgence (2016)

X-Men: Apocalypse (2016)

Hidden Figures (2016)

References

20th Century Studios
American companies established in 2008
American companies disestablished in 2017
Disney production studios
2008 establishments in California
2017 disestablishments in California